Lee Michelle Naylor  (born 26 January 1971 in Shepparton, Victoria) is a retired sprinter from Australia. She qualified to the quarter-finals in the 400 metres at the 1996 Summer Olympics before finishing 8th and ran on her national 4 × 400 metres relay team that finished sixth in the qualifying round.  At the 2000 Summer Olympics she repeated qualifying to the quarter-finals then finishing 8th in the quarterfinals.

At the 1995 World Championships in Athletics her relay team captured the bronze medal.  She ran the third leg on her relay team at the 1998 Commonwealth Games that won gold.  She also set her personal record at 51.35 that year.  At the 1999 World Championships in Athletics she was disqualified for a lane violation.

Naylor received a doctorate in neurochemistry from the University of Melbourne.

She was awarded the Medal of the Order of Australia in the 2022 Queen's Birthday Honours.

She is the mother of Australian rules football player Max Holmes.

References

External links

1971 births
Living people
People from Shepparton
Sportswomen from Victoria (Australia)
Australian female sprinters
Olympic athletes of Australia
Recipients of the Medal of the Order of Australia
Athletes (track and field) at the 1996 Summer Olympics
Athletes (track and field) at the 2000 Summer Olympics
Commonwealth Games gold medallists for Australia
Commonwealth Games medallists in athletics
Athletes (track and field) at the 1994 Commonwealth Games
Athletes (track and field) at the 1998 Commonwealth Games
World Athletics Championships athletes for Australia
World Athletics Championships medalists
University of Melbourne alumni
Medallists at the 1998 Commonwealth Games